Supreme Ruthenian Council was the first legal Ruthenian political organization that existed from May 1848 to June 1851.

It was founded on 2 May 1848 in Lemberg (today Lviv), Austrian Empire as the result of the 1848 Spring of Nations and in response to the earlier created by the local Polish community Central National Council which claim itself as the representative body of the Kingdom of Galicia and Lodomeria. In its manifest of 10 May 1848 the council declared about the unity of all 15 million Ukrainian people and expressed its support for all people of the Austrian Empire.

The organization had three main political requests.
 Divide Galicia into two separate administrative units: western for Poles and eastern for Ukrainians
 Unite into one province all Ukrainian lands of Galicia, Subcarpathia, and Bucovina
 Lectures in schools and publishing of government statements need to be conducted in Ukrainian language

Supreme Ruthenian Council consisted of 30 members who were representatives of the Ukrainian Greek Catholic Church and intelligentsia. Head of the council was elected bishop of Premissel Hryhoriy Yakhymovych, later canon . The council contained several departments.

Three members of the organization attended the Prague Slavic Congress in June 1848.

On 18 May 1848 the council decided the problem with national symbols declaring that "the flag of local Ruthenian land consists of the lion, and the colors of Ruthenia are yellow and blue" (Ruthenian: знамя земли рускои тутейшои єсть левъ, а цвѣты руски жовтый и синый). On 25 May 1848 on tower of the Lviv Town Hall (Ratusz) was hanged "a banner of Ruthenian colors, and next to it, on the left side, a Polish banner" (Ruthenian: хоруговъ рускои барвы, а при ней зъ лѣвои стороны хоруговъ польску), while the Supreme Ruthenian Council were disassociating themselves from the event and in the newspaper "Zoria Halytska" printed "it was not Ruthenians who have done it, and we even do not know who did" (Ruthenian: то не Русини оучинили, и наветъ не знаютъ, кто тоє оучинивъ). 

Next year, the Supreme Ruthenian Council ordered to held festivities in Lviv Town Hall, including hanging "Ruthenian blue-yellow and Austrian black-yellow" banners.

See also
 Prague Slavic Congress, 1848
 Ruthenian sobor

External links 
 Ruthenian Congress in the Encyclopedia of Ukraine, vol. 3 (1993)
 Supreme Ruthenian Council in the Encyclopedia of Ukraine, vol. 3 (1993)

References 

History of Lviv
1848 establishments in the Austrian Empire
1851 disestablishments in the Austrian Empire
Ukrainian political parties in Austria-Hungary
Revolutions of 1848 in the Austrian Empire
Establishments in the Kingdom of Galicia and Lodomeria
History of Ruthenia